Talea may refer to:

Repeated rhythmic pattern used in isorhythm
Talea, Prahova, a commune in Prahova County, Romania
A brand of Italian amaretto cream liqueur
Talea, a fictional character from the Spellsinger series by Alan Dean Foster
Talea, a 2013 Austrian film by Katharina Mückstein